Troels Rasmussen (born 7 April 1961) is a Danish former professional footballer who played as a goalkeeper for Danish clubs Vejle Boldklub and AGF. He played 391 games for AGF, and scored five goals from penalty kicks. From 1982 to 1991, he played 35 matches for the Denmark national team, and represented Denmark at the Euro 1984, Euro 1988 and 1986 World Cup tournaments. He played two matches at each of the two latter tournaments.

External links
 
 Aarhus GF profile
  Vejle Boldklub profile

1961 births
Living people
People from Ebeltoft
Danish men's footballers
Association football goalkeepers
Denmark international footballers
Denmark under-21 international footballers
Danish Superliga players
Vejle Boldklub players
Aarhus Gymnastikforening players
UEFA Euro 1984 players
1986 FIFA World Cup players
UEFA Euro 1988 players
Sportspeople from the Central Denmark Region